Ali Ghito (born Adelheid Schnabel-Fürbringer; 11 January 1905 – 29 April 1983) was a German stage and film actress.

Selected filmography
 Eight Girls in a Boat (1932)
 A Man with Heart (1932)
 Ways to a Good Marriage (1933)
 The Rider on the White Horse (1934)
 The Champion of Pontresina (1934)
 Kitty and the World Conference (1939)
 Carl Peters (1941)
 Quax in Africa (1947)

References

Bibliography
 Goble, Alan. The Complete Index to Literary Sources in Film. Walter de Gruyter, 1999.

External links

1905 births
1983 deaths
German film actresses
German stage actresses
German emigrants to the United States
People from Gera
20th-century German actresses